Gregory G. Dell'Omo is the seventh president of Rider University. He assumed office on August 1, 2015, succeeding Mordechai Rozanski.

Biography 
Dell’Omo received a Bachelor of Arts in economics from Montclair State University, a Master of Science in industrial relations from Rutgers University and a Ph.D. in industrial relations/human resource management from the University of Wisconsin-Madison.

Dell’Omo began his academic career at Canisius College as an assistant professor. He then joined St. Joseph's University where he was a professor of management and also held a sequence of academic and administrative positions, including Dean of the Haub School of Business, Associate Vice President for Academic Affairs and Vice President for External Affairs. Prior to assuming presidency at Rider, Dell’Omo served for ten years as the seventh president of Robert Morris University.

Dell’Omo oversaw the controversial relocation of Westminster Choir College of Rider University from its Princeton campus to Rider’s main campus in Lawrenceville.

The Rider University Board of Trustees extended Dell’Omo’s Presidency through 2024.

In 2021, Dell’Omo was elected to the board of directors of the National Association of Independent Colleges and Universities (NAICU) to represent the region that includes New Jersey, Delaware, District of Columbia, Maryland and New York.

References 

Heads of universities and colleges in the United States
Rider University faculty

Year of birth missing (living people)
Living people
Canisius College faculty
Saint Joseph's University faculty